Terrance Jerome Herrington (born July 31, 1966, in Hartsville, South Carolina) is a retired American middle-distance runner who specialized in the 1500 meters. He represented his country at the 1992 Summer Olympics as well as three consecutive World Championships.

Competition record

Personal bests
Outdoor
800 meters – 1:46.12 (Borlänge 1995)
1500 meters – 3:35.77 (Monaco 1991)
One mile – 3:53.64 (Eugene 1995)
3000 meters – 8:10.88 (New York 1995)
Indoor
1500 meters – 3:41.98 (Birmingham 1993)
One mile – 3:56.89 (Fairfax 1995)

References

All-Athletics profile

1966 births
Living people
People from Hartsville, South Carolina
American male middle-distance runners
African-American male track and field athletes
Pan American Games track and field athletes for the United States
Pan American Games medalists in athletics (track and field)
Athletes (track and field) at the 1995 Pan American Games
Athletes (track and field) at the 1992 Summer Olympics
Olympic track and field athletes of the United States
World Athletics Championships athletes for the United States
Clemson Tigers men's track and field athletes
Pan American Games silver medalists for the United States
Medalists at the 1995 Pan American Games
21st-century African-American people
20th-century African-American sportspeople